Albert R. Tadych was a member of the Wisconsin State Assembly.

Biography
Tadych was born on March 23, 1932, in Milwaukee, Wisconsin. He graduated from Marquette University and from Marquette University Law School. Tadych died on September 1, 2001.

Career
Tadych was elected to the Assembly in 1960 and 1962. He was a Democrat.

References

Politicians from Milwaukee
Democratic Party members of the Wisconsin State Assembly
Marquette University Law School alumni
1932 births
2001 deaths
20th-century American politicians